Rutgers Robert Wood Johnson Medical School is a medical school of Rutgers University. It is one of the two graduate medical schools of Rutgers Biomedical and Health Sciences, together with New Jersey Medical School, and is closely aligned with Robert Wood Johnson University Hospital, the medical school's principal affiliate.

Rutgers Robert Wood Johnson Medical School operates campuses in Piscataway and New Brunswick in New Jersey. The medical school includes 20 basic science and clinical departments and a broad range of clinical programs conducted at its 34 hospital affiliates and numerous ambulatory care sites in the region.

The school is named after Robert Wood Johnson II, the former president and chairman of the board of Johnson & Johnson. Prior to July 2013, Robert Wood Johnson Medical School was part of the University of Medicine and Dentistry of New Jersey (UMDNJ). In 2015-16 admissions cycle, the medical school has introduced the CASPer test, developed by McMaster University Medical School in Canada, as an admissions tool.

Statistics 
The medical school has more than 2,450 full-time, part-time and volunteer faculty and 2,530 staff members. Approximately 757 medical students are enrolled at Robert Wood Johnson Medical School as well as 120 PhD students. The Class of 2017 has 134 students with 54% women and 53% native New Jersey residents. Robert Wood Johnson Medical School ranks among the top 10 percent nationally of medical schools in minority student enrollment. 42 percent of the student body are alumni of Rutgers University and 16 percent attended Ivy League colleges. Eighty percent had a single or double major in the biological or physical sciences, and four students were pre-accepted as members of the MD/PhD program.

Rutgers Robert Wood Johnson Medical School sponsors 49 programs in graduate medical education, 41 of which are accredited by the Accreditation Council on Graduate Medical Education (ACGME), five accredited by Specialty Boards or Societies and two without the option of accreditation.  These include: anesthesia, family medicine, medicine, neurology, obstetrics/gynecology, pathology, pediatrics, psychiatry, radiology and surgery. There are 447 residents and fellows in programs accredited by the ACGME or the ABMS. There are four additional fellowships for which ACGME or ABMS accreditation is not available. Continuing medical education programs are conducted on a global basis.

Patient Care
The medical school's faculty physicians provide clinical care as part of Rutgers Health and Rutgers Health Group. The school has more than 500 physician members and 200 clinical programs. Faculty physicians provide clinical care at numerous hospitals and ambulatory care sites throughout the state. In September 2017, The Joint Commission granted the school's clinical services Accredited Status for Ambulatory Health Care, recognizing its compliance with national standards and commitment to providing safe and efficient patient care.

The Eric B. Chandler Health Center, a federally qualified health center owned by the medical school, provides more than 60,000 patient encounters. It is the only family health center of its kind in New Jersey that is supported by a medical school and operated jointly with a community board. It strives to eliminate barriers to obtaining quality, family-oriented primary and dental health for its diverse population.

Hospitals

Principal Hospital 

 Robert Wood Johnson University Hospital - New Brunswick, NJ

University Hospitals 

 Jersey Shore University Medical Center - Neptune, NJ
 Penn Medicine Princeton Medical Center - Plainsboro, NJ

Major Clinical Affiliates 

 Saint Peter's University Hospital - New Brunswick, NJ
 Raritan Bay Medical Center - Old Bridge, NJ and Perth Amboy, NJ
 Robert Wood Johnson University Hospital Somerset - Somerset, New Jersey

Clinical Affiliates 

 Bayshore Medical Center - Holmdel, NJ
 Capital Health Regional Medical Center - Trenton, NJ
 Carrier Clinic - Belle Mead, NJ
 CentraState Medical Center - Freehold, NJ
 Children's Specialized Hospital - New Brunswick, NJ
 Deborah Heart and Lung Center - Browns Mills, NJ
 Hunterdon Medical Center - Raritan, NJ
 JFK Medical Center - Edison, NJ
 Monmouth Medical Center - Long Branch, NJ
 Morristown Medical Center - Morristown, NJ
 Ocean Medical Center - Brick, NJ
 Overlook Medical Center - Summit, NJ
 Riverview Medical Center - Red Bank, NJ
 St. Francis Medical Center - Trenton, NJ
 St. Joseph's Regional Medical Center - Paterson, NJ
 University Behavioral Health Care - Piscataway, NJ
 VA New Jersey Health Care System, Lyons Campus - Lyons, NJ
 Virtua Memorial - Marlton, NJ
 Virtua Voorhees - Vorhees, NJ
 St. Luke's Warren - Phillipsburg, NJ

Research 
Robert Wood Johnson Medical School received $89 million in research grant awards in FY 2012. Of this amount, $50 million was from the National Institutes of Health. There is substantial strength within cancer, child health, neuroscience, and cell biology research programs.

Centers and Institutes 
Robert Wood Johnson Medical School has approximately 85 affiliated centers and institutes. The major centers and institutes include:
 Cardiovascular Institute of New Jersey
 Rutgers Cancer Institute of New Jersey
 Child Health Institute of New Jersey
 Clinical Research Center
 Women's Health Institute
 Center for Advanced Biotechnology and Medicine

Accreditation 
Robert Wood Johnson Medical School is accredited by the Liaison Committee on Medical Education of the Association of American Medical Colleges (AAMC) and the American Medical Association. The medical school is a full member of AAMC.

Robert Wood Johnson Medical School is accredited by the Commission on Higher Education of the Middle States Association of Colleges and Schools.

All education programs of Robert Wood Johnson Medical School have been approved by the academic, governmental and professional agencies with responsibilities in specific areas of specialization.

The primary and affiliated teaching hospitals of the medical school are accredited by The Joint Commission (JCAHO).

References

External links
 

Education in Middlesex County, New Jersey
New Brunswick, New Jersey
Piscataway, New Jersey
Medical schools in New Jersey
Rutgers University colleges and schools
University of Medicine and Dentistry of New Jersey
Educational institutions established in 1962
1962 establishments in New Jersey
Rutgers University buildings